Kitanya Hughes (born 3 November 1982) is an Antiguan footballer who plays as a midfielder.

External links 
 

1982 births
Living people
Antigua and Barbuda footballers
Antigua and Barbuda international footballers

Association football midfielders